The Al-Asha'ir Mosque or the Great Mosque of Zabid, is an ancient mosque in the historic city of Zabid, Yemen. It is located near the Zubaid market, forming a part of UNESCO World Heritage Site Historic Town of Zabid. Its foundation is owing to the great Sahabi Abu Musa al-Ash'ari in the year 8 AH or 629 CE and since then the mosque was the first mosque to achieve its spiritual and historical status in Yemen. Local tradition narrates that the mosque is fifth oldest mosque in the history of Islam, making it one of the oldest mosques in the world. The mosque underwent several renovations, but the most important additions of which were made during the reign of Sultan Al-Mansour Abdul Wahab bin Dawood in the year 1486, and since then the shape of the mosque remained as it is to this day, as pointed out by the great historian Ibn al-Dhibir in his book In Order to Benefit.

Architecture
The mosque occupies a rectangular area (50.35 x 50.24 m) and contains an open sahn measuring 11 x 5 square meters. Surrounded by four corridors, the qibla can be accessed through the main gate located on the south side or through the other doors distributed on the walls of the mosque, which are open directly to the qibla hallway. It is worth mentioning that the mihrab is not in the middle of the qibla wall. This is due to the repeated additions to the mosque, for example a wooden platform inside the wall to the east of the mihrab, a pulpit dating back to the year 1542.

The minaret of the mosque is located in the southern hallway and based on a square base topped by an octagonal body adorned with muqarnas composed of the intersection of the lines. The minaret is covered by fortress dome on the top, which is a design prevalent among the minarets of other mosques in Zabid.

The mosque has a wooden chair that was dedicated to the reading of the Prophet's Hadith and is still in the qibla hallway to this day since the date of its creation in the year 927.

The Mosque of Al-Asha'ir was also functioned as an Islamic University and students were lived there throughout the history, as dorms were established for foreign students from all over Yemen and the Islamic world.

See also
List of mosques in Yemen

References

7th-century mosques
Asha'ir
Mosques completed in 629